Hiro Poroiae (born 14 June 1986) is a Tahitian footballer who plays as a midfielder. He currently plays for AS Manu-Ura in the Tahiti Division Fédérale and the Tahiti national football team. He made his debut for the national team on 2007 against Tuvalu.

In 2013 he was selected for the team for the Confederations Cup.

International goals

Honours
OFC Nations Cup:
 Winner (1): 2012

International career statistics

References

External links

1983 births
Living people
French Polynesian footballers
Tahiti international footballers
Association football midfielders
2012 OFC Nations Cup players